This is a list of diplomatic missions in Botswana excluding honorary consulates. The capital Gaborone currently hosts 21 embassies and 1 delegation (European Union). The city is also host to several international organizations. Most of the non-resident diplomatic missions that are accredited to Botswana are located in South Africa.

Honorary consulates are omitted from this listing.

Diplomatic missions in Botswana

Gallery

Non-resident embassies and High Commissions 
Most of the accredited non-resident embassies to Botswana are in Pretoria, South Africa. However, some are in Zimbabwe, Zambia, Ethiopia or Namibia.

(Resident in Pretoria unless stated otherwise.

Closed missions

See also 
Foreign relations of Botswana
List of diplomatic missions of Botswana

References

External links 
List of embassies and high consulates in Botswana
Brazilian Embassy
British High Commission
Chinese Embassy
Cuban Embassy
European Union Delegation
French Embassy
German Embassy
Japanese Embassy
Kenyan High Commission
Russian Embassy
United States Embassy
Zimbabwean Embassy

Diplomatic missions
Botswana
Diplomatic missions